In American football and Canadian football, a quarterback kneel, also called taking a knee, genuflect offense, kneel-down offense, or victory formation, occurs when the quarterback touches a knee to the ground immediately after receiving the snap, thus downing himself and ending the play. It is primarily used to run the clock down, either at the end of the first half (regardless of which team is ahead) or the game itself, to preserve a lead. Although it generally results in a loss of some yardage and uses up a down, it minimizes the risk of a fumble, which would give the other team a chance at recovering the ball.

The play is meant to keep the defense from seriously challenging for possession of the ball. The rules penalize rough play after the ball is dead, which in this play usually occurs a fraction of a second after the snap. Especially when the outcome of the game is all but certain, defenses will often give little resistance to the play as a matter of sportsmanship as well as to reduce the risk of injuries, penalties, and possible supplemental discipline (Referees and leagues have in recent years given increasingly severe penalties for unnecessary roughness inflicted on quarterbacks, as well as headshots in general). The quarterback is generally not touched.

The formation offers maximum protection against a fumble; should the center-quarterback exchange result in a fumble, a running back is lined up on either side of the quarterback, both to recover any fumble and protect the vulnerable kneeling player from being injured by defensive players who get through the line. Also, a player known as the "safety valve" is lined up directly behind the quarterback, often much farther than a typical tailback would line up. This player's responsibility is to tackle any defensive player who may recover a fumble and attempt to advance it. Because of this essentially "defensive" responsibility, the tailback in this formation may actually be a free safety or other defensive player who is adept at making tackles in the open field.

Even though the play itself takes very little time, the rules of American football dictate that it does not stop the game clock (as with any play where the ball carrier is tackled in bounds). With the 40-second play clock in the NFL and NCAA, along with the two-minute warning in the NFL, a team can run off over two minutes with three straight kneel-downs if the defensive team has no more timeouts. The winning team can storm the field if up to 40 seconds remains in the game (25 in XFL or 35 in USFL). In such situations, even before the game is technically over (i.e. the game clock will still be running), it is common for opposing coaches, team staff and players (including those not on the field for the final play) to shake hands with each other, and for media and other accredited persons to come onto the field as well to commence interviews. In the XFL, as many as three straight "victory formations" from 75 seconds (or in USFL, 1:45) left in regulation can be done.

The kneeldown is often called a "victory formation", as it is most often run by a winning team late in the game in order to preserve a victory. In the case of a close game, the winning team would be trying to avoid a turnover which might be the result of a more complex play. In the case of a more lopsided contest where the winning team's overall point differential has no prospect of affecting their playoff qualification prospects, the play can be run as a matter of sportsmanship (the winning team forgoing the opportunity to run up the score) and to avoid injuries and/or penalties. In terms of statistics, a kneel by the quarterback is typically recorded as a rushing attempt for −1 or −2 yards.

Other sports also use the term "victory formation" for a play designed only to run down the clock with little chance of injury, such as a jammer in roller derby skating behind or only lightly challenging the pack while the final seconds of the bout tick down.

Strategy
The quarterback kneel is mainly used when the team in the lead has possession of the ball with less than two minutes on the game clock. The two minute warning automatically stops the clock in an NFL game; thus, regardless of the circumstances, the team with possession after the two minute warning must run a play in order to re-start the clock. Therefore, with the 40-second play clock in the NFL and NCAA, two minutes (120 seconds) is in theory the maximum amount of time that can be run off on three consecutive quarterback kneels; this assumes it is first down and the defense has no timeouts remaining. A team cannot run more than three consecutive quarterback kneels, as doing so on fourth down turns the ball over to the opponent and guarantees them at least one opportunity to score. The decision to run the quarterback kneel depends on the amount of time remaining in the game, the down, and the number of timeouts the defense has remaining. For example, if there is one minute remaining on the game clock on first down, and the defense has one timeout left, the offense may use two successive quarterback kneels to completely run out the clock, and if the defense uses its timeout, the offense can simply execute a third kneel to run out the clock. However, if there is one minute remaining on the game clock on third down, then regardless of how many timeouts the defense has, quarterback kneels will not completely run out the clock and the offense must try to make a first down. The XFL allows this to happen if up to 75 seconds remain; that league utilizes a 25-second play clock.

The quarterback kneel is also often used at the end of the first half after the opposition scores by a team which feels they have little chance of scoring before halftime due to poor field position, or the team will receive possession anyways on the kickoff after halftime, making a rushed drive pointless. It is also sometimes run at the end of the second half of a tie game by a team content with sending the game into overtime. Less commonly, the play is sometimes run at the end of the game by a losing team which is hopelessly behind and wishes to hasten the end of the game without threatening player health on needless garbage time drives. Rarely, in blowout situations in high school or small college sports, the decision to kneel is made mutually by both coaches if a deficit is too large to realistically overcome.

A team that is in field-goal range and either tied on the score or trailing by 1 or 2 points can also use one or more kneeldowns in order to run time off the clock before attempting a field goal. A quarterback in this situation may also run several yards to his left or right before kneeling down in order to center the spot for a field goal attempt, in order to try and get the ball closer to the goal line and/or to get the ball to a particular set of hash marks if the team's kicker has a preference for where they kick. Ideally, the clock should run out during the field goal attempt, disallowing the next kickoff and an attempt for the next team to score.

A quarterback kneel used to be purposefully initiated on a point after touchdown try at the end of the game after a game-winning or defensive touchdown was scored at the end of regulation; NFL rules required the try to be executed between the offense and defense, even if the offense intends to decline the unnecessary points to avoid further insulting or annoying their opponent. This occurred prominently in the "Minneapolis Miracle" during the 2017 Playoffs, in which eight New Orleans Saints players on offense and defense had to return to the field from the locker room to 'oppose' the try against the victorious Minnesota Vikings after referee imploration to complete the try. Quarterback Case Keenum merely knelt the ball down before tossing it in the air and celebrating the Vikings victory, with the Saints giving no effort. The rule was changed for the 2018 season to omit the try if it would have no impact on the outcome of the game.

In rare instances, a team will use the quarterback kneel to avoid running up the score in a lopsided contest, even though there may be significant time remaining on the clock. This occurred in the 2011 edition of the Magnolia Bowl between the LSU Tigers and Ole Miss Rebels. With five minutes remaining and LSU leading 52–3, Tigers' head coach Les Miles ordered third-string quarterback Zach Mettenberger to kneel on first and goal from the Ole Miss one-yard line, and to kneel on the next three plays. Miles felt another touchdown would further embarrass Ole Miss coach Houston Nutt, who announced his resignation, effective at the end of the season, 12 days before the Rebels hosted first-ranked LSU. The Tigers had already secured the largest margin of victory in series history.

On rare occasions, quarterbacks will kneel to ensure a tie when the overtime period (or fourth quarter in competitions which do not use overtime) is about to expire, especially if the tie might still be of some benefit to the team's playoff fortunes compared to a loss. Notably, if a team has possession of the ball deep in its own territory in such a situation, it may be as likely or more likely to turn over the ball in its own territory (which would give the opponent a good chance to score and thus win the game) than they are to advance the ball far enough to obtain a good scoring chance themselves.

In Canadian football, which has slightly different rules, the circumstances in which kneeling is a viable strategy are more limited. Unlike in American football, in Canadian football every quarter must end with a play, even in situations where the game clock expires after the end of the previous play. Also, the play clock in the CFL is only twenty seconds long. Therefore, since the offence only has three downs, the maximum amount of time an offence can consume by kneeling without attempting to earn another first down (i.e. after the offence earns a first down while keeping the ball in bounds and the defense has no time outs) is a little over one minute. On the other hand, in Canadian football teams have only one time out per half, compared to three in American football.

In Canadian football, a quarterback kneel is by far the most common play for winning teams to run with "zeros on the clock" at the end of a game, barring exceptional (but not unheard-of) situations where the head-to-head point differential in the opposing team's season series (a key factor in tiebreakers) remains in doubt (under the current CFL playoff format and tiebreakers, this is only relevant for teams in the same division). Moreover, in that situation such a play can be run on any down - even if it is third down when time expires between plays, a kneel will not result in a turnover on downs since the game will be over. Thus, even though there is one less down in Canadian football, there are still occasional circumstances in which a winning team will kneel on three consecutive plays (the same maximum number as is feasible in American football) in order to end the game.

A "fake kneel" is very rare, and would likely be considered extremely unsportsmanlike in the vast majority of situations where a kneel would be expected. In situations where kneeling would be useful, but where the team with the ball can also want to score or drive the ball forward. This might take place at the end of the first half with a team in the lead running the clock down before faking the kneel in an attempt to surprise the defense, or in a tied game at the end of regulation play. An example of this was in Super Bowl LI, with the game tied 28-28, on the final play of regulation, the New England Patriots ran a fake kneel where Tom Brady faked a run & pitch to his right, with Dion Lewis waiting a second before taking the ball & running to his left. While initially surprised, the Atlanta Falcons defence reacted on both sides of the field, shutting down the play with a nominal gain of 12 yards. At the end of the run Lewis stopped and attempted to shift inside, but aggravated a hamstring injury during the play and fell out of bounds without being touched. Coach Bill Belichick decided on the trick play because the team were too far away for a field goal, and the 75 yards distance for a hail mary was likely too far for Brady to reach the endzone.

History
Until the 1960s, keeping track of the official time in a gridiron football game was the responsibility of the referee. The stadium game time, if displayed at all, was unofficial and often done so with poor-quality analog scoreboard clocks utilizing clock-like dials that did not meet a universal league standard, requiring more effort to ascertain the exact time left. Moreover, many of the stadiums used at the time primarily hosted baseball, thus the scoreboards were optimized for a sport which did not even use a game clock, and were often in incongruent positions not easily visible to the players, with timing also done by portable devices rented by the teams that were not synchronized to the main board.

Thus, it was not feasible for teams to engage in the sort of meticulous clock management that would eventually become commonplace in the modern era, since coaches and players had only a rough estimate of how much time remained after each play. The risk of miscalculating the amount of time remaining in a half or game was a strong deterrent against willfully foregoing the opportunity to advance the ball on each down. A play clock visible to all in the stadium was not instituted in the NFL until 1976, meaning the timing of a kneel could not be ascertained.

Traditionally, teams leading after the two minute warning generally ran quarterback sneaks (which brought the risk of injuries on low-yardage plays) or dive plays to the fullbacks or other running backs to run time off the clock. Even after the stadium game clock became official, this tradition endured for a time as many coaches in this era considered kneeling cowardly or even unsportsmanlike. However, the Miracle at the Meadowlands, on November 19, in which defensive back Herman Edwards of the visiting Philadelphia Eagles recovered a botched handoff between quarterback Joe Pisarcik and running back Larry Csonka of the New York Giants, provided a nationally televised spur for change.

With 31 seconds remaining, the Giants led 17–12 and the Eagles were out of timeouts. As Pisarcik attempted to hand the ball to Larry Csonka, it was awkwardly fumbled; Edwards scooped it up and ran it 26 yards for the Eagles' improbable  The play generated tremendous controversy, ridicule, and criticism toward the Giants nationwide and specifically offensive coordinator Bob Gibson for failing to use the supposedly foolproof quarterback-kneeldown play. Gibson was promptly fired following the game, and never worked in football again.

In the week following the game, both the Eagles and Giants developed specific formations designed to protect the quarterback behind three players as he fell on the ball. Previously, quarterbacks executing a similar "kill the clock" play simply ran a quarterback sneak from a tightly packed conventional offensive formation.  The Eagles made the playoffs and the Giants finished at 

The "victory formation" spread rapidly throughout football at nearly all levels, as coaches sought to adopt a procedure for downing the ball in the final seconds which would reduce the risk of turnovers to the absolute minimum possible. Within a season or so, it had become nearly universal. In 1987 the NFL rule allowing quarterbacks to simply kneel and not have to fall down and risk a hit from the defense took effect.

One of the revived XFL's most significant officiating controversies in 2020 occurred as a direct consequence of a mistimed quarterback kneel. While leading 32–23 over the Seattle Dragons, Houston Roughnecks quarterback P. J. Walker kneeled on fourth down at his own 21-yard line with three seconds remaining on the clock. Officials mistakenly declared the game over, thus depriving the Dragons the chance to run at least one offensive play in which (due to the XFL's three-point conversion rule) they should have had a chance to tie the game and force overtime. The league quickly admitted the mistake and largely avoided further scrutiny after, along with nearly all other professional sports leagues, it cancelled the remainder of its season due to the COVID-19 pandemic.

Defense

Although in most instances a losing team will concede defeat when the other team is in the victory formation and taking the quarterback kneel, there are instances where the trailing team will try to make a defensive play in an attempt to regain possession of the ball, particularly when the losing team is behind by a touchdown or less and there is enough time to make more than one play.

This had happened on the play preceding the Miracle at the Meadowlands. Due to the extreme difficulty and unlikelihood of causing a legal turnover when compared to the risks of injury, penalty and supplemental discipline, defenses generally do not attempt to disrupt the kneeldown as the Eagles did in 1978. By the 1980s, a "gentlemen's agreement" emerged in which defenders did not rush the offensive team with high intensity, as long as the offense made no attempt to advance the ball.

One prominent exception occurred to another Giants quarterback in 2012. In Week 2, an interception of a Tampa Bay Buccaneers pass with six seconds left had apparently secured a 25-point fourth-quarter comeback and 41–34 Giants victory. However, in the ensuing "victory formation" play, instead of the usual nominal contact between the lineman, the Buccaneers stacked the line of scrimmage and forcefully pushed the Giants' line back in an attempt to cause Giants' QB Eli Manning to fumble.  Manning was knocked back by his own center as he took the snap and fell down. Giants coach Tom Coughlin angrily confronted his Tampa Bay counterpart, Greg Schiano, at midfield once the game was over. Undaunted, Schiano employed a similar strategy the next week at the end of the Buccaneers' game against the Dallas Cowboys.  In the next season, with the Philadelphia Eagles leading the Buccaneers, Chip Kelly had quarterback Nick Foles attempt a shotgun formation kneeldown to avert Schiano's aggressive technique, which succeeded. On occasions especially in major games, the defense has made it clear they will not concede and have attempted to aggressively rush the keel down. In Super Bowl XLIX, the Seattle Seahawks, who were at their opponents' goal line as time ran out, attempted to rush the New England Patriots offensive line on two occasions, in the first instance causing an offside penalty and in the second, an on-field altercation between the two sets of players, leading to the first (and as of 2020 only) Super Bowl ejection of Seahawks player, Bruce Irvin. On the third kneeldown attempt, no rushing attempt was made.  Several years later, the San Francisco 49ers also tried to rush the kneel on each down of the final possession of Super Bowl LIV, forcing Patrick Mahomes to instead run back on his first three kneel-downs and to reel back on fourth down and throw a long pass to expire the last five seconds of the game and seal the victory for the Kansas City Chiefs. These "kneels" had a combined loss of 15 yards and dropped Mahomes' game yards from 44 to 29, which affected the margins for Vegas bettors (in college football, quarterback kneel-downs are charged as "Team" rushing yards, not to the quarterback).

Aside from trying to attempt a defensive play, teams that are losing but behind by a touchdown or less in the final two minutes will sometimes use their time-outs if the team does a quarterback kneel. As teams are allowed three time-outs per half—the clock stops on a time out and restarts on the snap—they will try to preserve them for situations such as this, thereby forcing the winning team to run a play and gain a first down or, at the very least, take time off the clock.

If there is still enough time left on the clock and the winning team attempts another quarterback kneel, the defensive team's strategy may repeat itself until it either runs out of time-outs, time runs out, or (most desirably) the team forces a punt or turnover, but the fourth down play is still subject to other maneuvers to run out the clock. In 2016, the Baltimore Ravens, leading in a game against the Cincinnati Bengals after three plays in their final drive, ran off the remaining twelve seconds of clock off in a punt formation with Sam Koch purposefully holding the ball in the end zone while multiple holding calls were made against the Ravens offense pushing back against (and in some cases, shoving down) Bengal players. The play ended with Koch touching his toe to the back end zone line after time expired and taking an intentional safety (offensive fouls at the end of the game do not result in a replay of a down, unlike their defensive equivalents). The intentional holding aspect of the play was made illegal after the 2016 NFL season.

A team can also lose a game in a kneel-down situation due to mismanagement or miscalculating the time. For example, in a game against the UCF Golden Knights on December 4, 2014 East Carolina University coach Ruffin McNeill ordered his team to take a knee with 1:47 left on the clock and a 30-26 lead. UCF used its final timeout, preventing ECU from running out the clock, but McNeill chose to kneel on fourth down rather than attempt a 37-yard field goal. The play left 10 seconds on the clock and turned the ball over to UCF, who then completed a 14 yard pass and a 51 yard pass to score the winning touchdown.

Rules
The 2011 NFL Rules state in Rule 7, Section 2, Article 1(c): "An official shall declare the ball dead and the down ended … when a quarterback immediately drops to his knee (or simulates dropping to his knee) behind the line of scrimmage".

The 2011 and 2012 NCAA Rules state in Rule 4, Section 1, Article 3(o): "A live ball becomes dead and an official shall sound his whistle or declare it dead … When a ball carrier simulates placing his knee on the ground." The same rule is used by the British American Football Association.

The 2011 CFL Rules state in Rule 1, Section 4: "The ball is dead … When the quarterback, in possession of the ball, intentionally kneels on the ground during the last three minutes of a half". The Statistical Scoring Rules, Section 5(e) states: "When a quarterback voluntarily drops to one knee and concedes yards in an effort to run out the clock, the yards lost will be charged under Team Losses. NOTE – No quarterback sack will be given in this situation."

References

American football terminology
Kneeling